David Parks (born December 22, 1943) is an American politician from Las Vegas, Nevada. A Democrat, he served in the Nevada Senate for 12 years, representing the state's 7th district in Clark County. He was elected to the Senate in November 2008, prior to which he had served in the Nevada Assembly since 1996. He was term-limited in 2020 and did not run for re-election.

Early life and career
Educated at the University of New Hampshire, Parks served in the United States Air Force between 1967 and 1971, and was stationed at Nellis Air Force Base in Las Vegas. He then earned an MBA at the University of Nevada, Las Vegas.

Political offices

A former assistant director of Clark County's Regional Transportation Commission, he was first appointed to the Paradise Town Advisory Board in 1991 and served three terms. He was elected the board's chairman in 1992 and served in that role until his election to the State Assembly in November 1996. He was re-elected comfortably in 1998 and 2000.

In 2002, longtime Republican opponent Tony Dane (who Parks defeated in 1996 and 1998) convinced a man also called David Parks to run against him for the Democratic nomination in the 41st Assembly district. Challenger Parks' name was removed from the ballot when it became apparent that he was not a resident of Clark County, nor indeed of Nevada. Incumbent Parks won the general election and was re-elected again in 2004 and 2006.

He was not a candidate for re-election to the Assembly in 2008 but instead ran for the Nevada Senate in the 7th district, seeking to succeed Dina Titus who mounted a successful bid for Congress. Three Democrats and three Republicans filed for the seat. In the primary election held on August 12, 2008, he faced a well-funded opponent but prevailed easily, winning 71 percent of the vote in a three-way race. He faced Republican Lindsay Nicole Madsen in the November general election, winning easily; he garnered 68% of the vote to her 32%.

In 2010, he ran to succeed Rory Reid on the Clark County Commission, losing the Democratic primary election to Mary Beth Scow by just 91 votes.

He was appointed to the Governor's Statewide AIDS Advisory Task Force in 1987 (serving until 1994) and again in 2002 (still serving).

Electoral history
David Parks was elected in 1996 to serve in the Nevada State Assembly in Clark District 41.

Personal

He is openly gay and was the first openly gay member of the Nevada Legislature. He is one of five openly LGBT members of the Nevada legislature, alongside Senators Pat Spearman and Kelvin Atkinson, as well as Assemblymen Andrew Martin and James Healey. His election campaigns have won the support of the Gay & Lesbian Victory Fund.

References

External links 
 Assembly homepage

1943 births
Living people
Gay politicians
LGBT state legislators in Nevada
Democratic Party Nevada state senators
Democratic Party members of the Nevada Assembly
University of Nevada, Las Vegas alumni
University of New Hampshire alumni
American LGBT military personnel
United States Air Force airmen
21st-century American politicians
21st-century LGBT people